Chicalim is a census town in Morumugão Sub-District, Goa, India. It is a suburb to the port city of Vasco da Gama.

Geography

Demographics
As of the 2011 Indian census, Chicalim had a population of 6,933. Males constituted 57% of the population and females 43%. Chicalim had a literacy rate of 93.21%, higher than state average of 88.70%: male literacy was 96.13% and female literacy was 89.28%. 8.91% of the population was under 6 years of age.

Government
Chicalim, being a village, is governed by a Panchayat, or local rural governing body, under the Panchayati Raj Act. Latest panchayat elections took place in June 2012. The current Sarpanch seat has been reserved for women.

Chicalim comes under Dabolim constituency for the state assembly after delimitation of wards. Earlier it was under the Cortalim constituency. The current MLA is Mauvin Goudinho of the Bhartiya Janta Party (BJP) .

References

Villages in South Goa district